André Malet (1920-1989) was a French Catholic priest and philosopher who became a Unitarian Protestant.  Specialising in Martin Heidegger, he translated Rudolf Bultmann into French. He married Nicole Maya-Malet, another philosopher specialising in Heidegger, who was director of the Revue d'éthique et de théologie morale, published by CERF.

Works
 Thèse d'André Malet : Mythos et  Logos, 1962 (soutenue à la Sorbonne, Paris, France)
 Rudolf Bultmann, écrivain de toujours, éditions Seghers
 Article sur Rudolf Bultmann dans l'Encyclopedia Universalis
 André MALET, Bultmann et la mort de Dieu, Présentation, choix de textes, biographie, bibliographie, Paris, Seghers, Neuchâtel, Delachaux et Niestlé, 1959; réédition 1968
 André Malet La Pensée de Rudolf Bultmann,  Labor et fides - 1971.

Sources
 André Malet ou Un homme en quête de Dieu sur le site du centre Bachelard.
 Collectif, A. Malet interprète de Bultmann et apologiste de St-Thomas 1991

1989 deaths
1920 births
Converts to Protestantism
20th-century French philosophers
20th-century French Roman Catholic priests
French Unitarians
Year of birth unknown
French male writers
20th-century French male writers